Crossotus plumicornis is a species of beetle in the family Cerambycidae. It was described by Audinet-Serville in 1835. It is known from Botswana, Chad, Ethiopia, Guinea, Mauritania, Burkina Faso, Ivory Coast, Malawi, Mali, Mozambique, South Africa, Kenya, Namibia, Eritrea, Senegal, Somalia, Tanzania, Sudan, Zambia, Uganda, and Zimbabwe.

References

plumicornis
Beetles described in 1835